Blanche L. Friderici (January 21, 1878 – December 23, 1933) was an American film and stage actress, sometimes credited as Blanche Frederici.

Early years
Friderici was a native of Brooklyn, New York. Her parents were William E. Friderici and Rosetta Elizabeth Freeman Friderici.

Career
 
Friderici did not aspire to be an actress, but rather an acting and elocution teacher. However, her eyesight began to fail, deteriorating to the point she could no longer read, so she turned from teaching acting to actually acting. An admirer of her recitals introduced her to impresario David Belasco, who cast her in The Darling of the Gods.

Between 1914 and 1927, Friderici appeared in nine Broadway theatre productions in New York City, including a production of 39 East (1919) and as Mrs. Davidson in the play Rain.

Friderici appeared in sixty films from 1920 to 1934. Her début was as Miss McMasters in the film adaptation of 39 East (1920). In Night Nurse (1931), which starred Barbara Stanwyck and Clark Gable, she played a housekeeper too frightened to protect two children from a murder attempt. She portrayed a chaperone in Flying Down to Rio (1933). Her last film role was as a motel owner's wife in It Happened One Night (1934).

Personal life
Friderici married Donald Campbell in 1925.

Death
On December 24, 1933, on her way by automobile to attend a Christmas service at General Grant National Park with her stage manager husband, Donald Campbell, she died of a heart attack just after they reached Visalia, California. She was 55.

Complete filmography

39 East (1920) - Miss McMasters
No Trespassing (1922) - Dorinda
Sadie Thompson (1928) - Mrs. Alfred Davidson
Gentlemen Prefer Blondes (1928) - Miss Chapman
Fleetwing (1928) - Furja
Stolen Love (1928) - Aunt Evvie
Wonder of Women (1929) - Stephen Trombolt's Housekeeper
The Awful Truth (1929) - Mrs. Leeson
Jazz Heaven (1929) - Mrs. Langley
The Trespasser (1929) - Miss Potter - Nurse
The Flattering Word (1929 short) - Mrs. Zukor
The Dead Line (1929 short)
Marching On (1929 short)
Trifles (1929 short) - Mrs. Peters
 Personality (1930) - Ma
The Girl Said No (1930) - Mrs. McAndrews (uncredited)
A Notorious Affair (1930) - Lady Teel (uncredited)
Soldiers and Women (1930) - Martha
The Bad One (1930) - Madame Durand
Courage (1930) - Aunt Caroline
Numbered Men (1930) - Mrs. Miller
The Office Wife (1930) - Kate Halsey
Billy the Kid (1930) - Mrs. McSween
Kismet (1930) - Narjis
The Cat Creeps (1930) - Mam' Pleasant
Ten Cents a Dance (1931) - Mrs. Blanchard
Woman Hungry (1931) - Mrs. Temple
Night Nurse (1931) - Mrs. Maxwell
Murder by the Clock (1931) - Julia Endicott
The Woman Between (1931) - Mrs. Weston
 A Dangerous Affair (1931) - Letty Randolph
Friends and Lovers (1931) - Lady Allice
Wicked (1931) - Mrs. Johnson
Honor of the Family (1931) - Mme. Boris
Mata Hari (1931) - Sister Angelica
The Hatchet Man (1932) - Madame Si-Si (uncredited)
Lady with a Past (1932) - Nora
Young Bride (1932) - Miss Margaret Gordon, the Librarian
So Big (1932) - Widow Paarlenburg (uncredited)
State's Attorney (1932) - Night Court Judge (uncredited)
Miss Pinkerton (1932) - Mary
Love Me Tonight (1932) - Third Aunt
The Night Club Lady (1932) - Mrs. Carewe
Thirteen Women (1932) - Miss Kirsten
Three on a Match (1932) - Miss Blazer (uncredited)
If I Had a Million (1932) - Mrs. Garvey (uncredited)
Behind Jury Doors (1932) - Mrs. Lanfield
A Farewell to Arms (1932) - Head Nurse
Cynara (1932) - Concerned Mother in Courtroom (uncredited)
The Thundering Herd (1933) - Mrs. Jane Jett
Secrets (1933) - Mrs. Martha Marlowe
 Alimony Madness (1933) - Mrs. Van
The Barbarian (1933) - Mrs. Hume
Adorable (1933) - The Countess
Hold Your Man (1933) - Mrs. Wagner
Man of the Forest (1933) - Mrs. Peg Forney
Aggie Appleby, Maker of Men (1933) - Aunt Katherine
The Way to Love (1933) - Rosalie
Flying Down to Rio (1933) - Dona Elena De Rezende
All of Me (1934) - Miss Haskell
It Happened One Night (1934) - Zeke's wife

References

External links

1878 births
1933 deaths
Actresses from New York City
American film actresses
American silent film actresses
American stage actresses
Musicians from Brooklyn
20th-century American actresses